Edgar Feliciano Báez Fernández (born 21 March 1972 in Asunción, Paraguay) is a former footballer who played for clubs in Paraguay, Argentina and Brazil. Báez played once in a World Cup qualifying match for Paraguay in 1996.

Honours and achievements 
Santos
 Torneio Rio – São Paulo: 1997

References

External links

1972 births
Living people
Paraguayan footballers
Paraguayan expatriate footballers
Paraguay international footballers
Club Atlético Huracán footballers
Racing Club de Avellaneda footballers
Al Hilal SFC players
Cerro Porteño players
Club Sol de América footballers
Saudi Professional League players
Expatriate footballers in Argentina
Expatriate footballers in Brazil
Expatriate footballers in Saudi Arabia
Association football forwards